The Liga Nacional de Básquetbol de Chile, also known as the LNB Chile, is the top national basketball leagues in Chile, it is a professional league, organized by the Federación de Básquetbol de Chile. The league was created in 2010 and the old national league, Dimayor was discontinued in 2013, being the only basketball professional league in the country. The league is now referred as Liga DirecTV by Spalding for sponsorship reasons.

History

Founded in 2008 with the objective of forming strong competition from basketball at national level.

Initially there was the creation of three (League A, League B & League C) divisions, but only the latter two were played. In 2010 the League B was renamed the Liga Nacional de Básquetbol, ranking as the main category of the competition, while the League C was renamed Liga Nacional Promocional.

However, that year was constituted the Liga Nacional Superior, vocational and bringing together the country's top clubs.

The inaugural season of the National League had an optimistic hosting, with 12 teams participate in this country. After eliminating Sagrados Corazones and Universidad Católica, Español de Talca met CD Boston College in the finals, winning by a marker 3-1 to become the first champion of the LNB.

In the 2011-12 edition there was a great turnout, with 18 teams, but the defending champion Español de Talca opted to return to the Dimayor. The winner this time was Deportes Castro, who defeated CD Boston College in the finals.

The 2012-13 season saw Español de Talca again crowned champion against CD Boston College, who won their third consecutive sub-championship. The title completed what was nearly a perfect season with only two losses in the tournament, winning Game 4 in overtime.

The 2013-14 season included 16 teams, with debutant team Tinguiririca San Fernando being champions after winning the final 3-1 to Osorno Basketball at the Monumental María Gallardo. With the win Tinguiririca San Fernando became the first team in the Northern Zone to win the championship.

2014-15 saw CSD Colo Colo crowned champion, winning the series 3-2 against Deportes Castro in Chiloé. The championship win earns Colo Colo the honor to represent the country in the Liga Sudamericana de Básquetbol.

Format

All team from Liga Nacional de Básquetbol de Chile teams play each other twice during the regular season. At the end of the regular season, the top eight teams qualify for the playoffs.

Teams 2023

Original league system

Current system

Champions

Championship by team

References

External links 
 Liga Nacional de Básquetbol de Chile official website
 Official FebaChile
 Chilean league on Latinbasket.com

 
Chile
2010 establishments in Chile
Sports leagues established in 2010